Neuromodulation is the physiological process by which a given neuron uses one or more chemicals to regulate diverse populations of neurons. 

Neuromodulation may also refer to:

 Neuromodulation (medicine), the alteration of nerve activity through targeted delivery of a stimulus to specific neurological sites in the body
 Neuromodulation (journal), a medical journal